NGC 138 is a spiral galaxy in the constellation Pisces. It was discovered on August 29, 1864 by Albert Marth.

References

External links 
 

Astronomical objects discovered in 1864
Pisces (constellation)
+01-02-016
01889
00308
0138
Spiral galaxies